Robert Storr may refer to:

Robert Storr (art academic)
Robert Storr (banker)